High is the second extended play (EP) by Australian alternative pop singer-songwriter and producer Jarryd James. The EP was released on 29 July 2016 and debuted and peaked at no. 40 on the ARIA Albums Chart.

James collaborated with many sought-after producers, including long-time collaborator Joel Little, Mikky Ekko, Tobias Jesso Jr and Andrew "Pop" Wansel.

Upon release of the EP, James explained his songwriting; "I tend to only focus on the melodies and whatever happens instrumentally is just what feels right. I also don't come in with words already written, I like to form lyrics, let them be informed by the vibe of the music."

James will promote the album in the United States throughout August and September 2016.

Reception
Jessica Mule from Renowned for Sound gave the EP 4 stars out of 5, saying: "High simmers and stirs with its electro-R&B influence. Each of the six tracks on the EP stands on their own with its own emotional fingerprint."

AAA Backstage gave the EP 3.5 out of 5 saying' "Although edgy at times, the EP features a timbre that feels familiar yet somehow vague at the same time. The tracks attempt to showcase a variety of vibes and certainly do justice to James’ excellent, if not sometimes wispy, vocals. Arguably lacking in wow-power, the EP delivers a polished version of exactly what we expected. It’s all about a rhythmic simplicity that hones in on lyrical memos, which is by no means a bad thing."

Track listing

Charts

References

2016 EPs
Indie pop EPs
EPs by Australian artists
Albums produced by Stuart Stuart